Arriagada is a Basque surname. Notable people include:

 Carmen Arriagada (1807-1888), Chilean writer
 Cristián Arriagada (born 1981), Chilean actor
 Iván Arriagada (born 1963), Chilean businessman
 Jorge Arriagada (born 1943), Chilean film composer
 Marcelo Arriagada (born 1973), Chilean cyclist
 Marco Arriagada (born 1975), Chilean cyclist